Lestes nigriceps is a species of spreadwing in the damselfly family Lestidae.

References

Further reading

 

Lestes
Articles created by Qbugbot
Insects described in 1924